Byomakesh Mohanty (17 November 1957, Cuttack, Orissa, India – 14 June 2010) was an Indian artist and academic. After completing his science studies and graduating from Utkal University, Bhubaneswar, Orissa, he joined as a faculty of visual arts at Banaras Hindu University.

Career 
After completion of his studies he devoted all his time and energy in pursuing Visual Art in the country and received several awards and honors at the national and international level.

He was convenor of Indo-Japan and Indo-France Art exhibitions organized in Orissa, and Professor at B.K College of Art and Craft till 2010. He guided the scholars after receiving a national scholarship. He was appointed as a Visualiser for national monuments in Orissa. Lastly, he joined Orissa State Lalit Kala Akademi as secretary.

He has participated in many Indian national level artist championships at Banaras, Lucknow, Allahabad, Patna, Madhubani, Puri, and Bhubaneshwar.

Prof. Byomakesh Mohanty memorial award is given by Artists’ Association of Orissa (AAO) in the name of Byomakesh to the artists for their significant contribution.

Exhibitions
Jehangir Art Gallery in Mumbai
ABC Art Gallery, Banaras
Academy of Fine Arts, Kolkata
Visva Bharati University at Santiniketan
Banaras Hindu University at Varanasi
Regional Art Centre At Madras, Lucknow and Bhubaneshwar
National Gallery of Modern Art, New Delhi
Lalit Kala Akademi at Rabindra Bhavan New Delhi
Orissa State Museum Bhubaneshwar
Regional Centre at Lucknow and Bhubaneshwar
State Governor's House at Bhubaneshwar
Indian Airlines at Mumbai
Düsseldorf Art Gallery, Germany
National Museum of France, Paris.

Awards
Three time recipient of State Award by Orissa Lalit Kala Akademi
All India Award by U.P State Lalit Kala Akademi
"Orissa Prativa Samman" by Indo Soviet Cultural Society (I.S.C.U.S.)
Vice Chancellor Award at Banaras Hindu University.

References

1957 births
People from Cuttack
Indian male painters
Academic staff of Banaras Hindu University
2010 deaths
20th-century Indian painters
Painters from Odisha